Sorbet is a frozen dessert of Iranian origin

Sorbet may also refer to: 

 Sorbet (Hannibal)
 Sorbet, Gers
 Sorbet, Landes

See also 

 Sorbetes
 Sherbet (frozen dessert)
 Sherbet (powder)
 Sharbat (beverage)